Hasan Vural (born 17 December 1973 in West Berlin, West Germany) is a Turkish former footballer and football manager.

Player career
Vural made 23 appearances for Erzurumspor in the Turkish Süper Lig and played one game for Hertha BSC in Germany's top-flight Bundesliga during his playing career.

On 18 February 1998, Vural earned an international cap for appearing in the final five minutes of a friendly game against Israel.

Manager career
Vural was appointed manager of the Gaziantep-based women's football club ALG Spor on 17 June 2021. His team finished the 2021-22 Turkish Women's Football Super League season as Group B leader and became league champion after the play-offs. On 19 June 2022, the club renewed his contract for the 2022-23 Women's League season. ALG Spor was entitled to represent Turkey at the 2022–23 UEFA Women's Champions League. They were eliminated in the First qualifying round Tournament 11's first match after losing 0–1 to SK Brann Kvinner from Norway.

Statistics
.

References

External links 
 
 Hasan Vural at the Turkish Football Federation

1973 births
Living people
Footballers from Berlin
Turkish footballers
Turkey international footballers
Association football defenders
Süper Lig players
Bundesliga players
2. Bundesliga players
Füchse Berlin Reinickendorf players
Hertha BSC players
KFC Uerdingen 05 players
FC Energie Cottbus players
VfL Osnabrück players
Erzurumspor footballers
SV Elversberg players
SV Eintracht Trier 05 players
SV Darmstadt 98 players
SV Yeşilyurt players
Berliner AK 07 players
Turkish women's football managers